The Yunlin County Government is the local government of Yunlin County, Taiwan.

Organizations

Units
 Civil Affairs Department
 Finance Department
 Economic Affairs Department
 Public Works Department
 Education Department
 Agriculture Department
 Social Affairs Department
 Labor affairs Department
 Urban and Rural Development
 Land Administration Department
 Information Department
 Cultural Affairs Department
 General Affairs Department
 Planning Department
 Personnel Department
 Budget, Accounting and Statistics
 Civil Service Ethics Department
 Water Resources Department

Subsidiaries
 Fire Safety Bureau
 Yunlin County Stadium
 Tax Collection Administration
 Police Bureau
 Environment Protection Bureau
 Health Bureau
 Domestic Animal Disease Control Laboratory
 Industrial Development and Investment Promotion Committee
 Procurement Center
 Family Education Center

Building
The Yunlin County Government building consists of:
 Building No. 1
 Building No. 2
 Building No. 3
 Social Affairs

See also
 Yunlin County Council

References

External links

 

Yunlin County
Local governments of the Republic of China